High Offley is a civil parish in the Borough of Stafford, Staffordshire, England. It contains twelve listed buildings that are recorded in the National Heritage List for England.  Of these, one is listed at Grade I, the highest of the three grades, one is at Grade II*, the middle grade, and the others are at Grade II, the lowest grade.  The parish contains the villages of High Offley and Woodseaves, and the surrounding countryside.  The Shropshire Union Canal runs through the parish, and a high proportion of the listed buildings are associated with it, namely, bridges, mileposts, and an aqueduct.  The other listed buildings include a church, two houses, the surviving portico of another house, a former toll house, and a milepost on a road.

Key

Buildings

References

Citations

Sources

Lists of listed buildings in Staffordshire